Friday the 13th is a survival horror video game developed by Atlus and published by LJN for the Nintendo Entertainment System. Based on the horror franchise of the same name, players control counselors at Camp Crystal Lake as they attempt to defeat Jason Voorhees. The game received generally negative reviews, with criticism centered on its high difficulty.

Gameplay

Players control one of six camp counselors (each with varying levels of speed, rowing, and jumping ability) in a side-scrolling perspective. The counselors start with an arcing rock attack. The goal is to find and defeat Jason Voorhees three times. Along the paths, players will find cabins, a lake, caves, and wooded areas with all but the cabins having enemies such as zombies, crows, and wolves attacking the player. Players may upgrade their weapons upon finding a new one. A timed alarm appears at certain intervals, requiring players to find Jason before he kills one or more children or another counselor. Using the map, players must navigate their way to Jason's location or switch to the counselor being attacked and defeat him. If they do not make it there in time, Jason will kill the counselors or some of the children.
 	
Upon nearing Jason's location, Jason may appear on the path or in the lake and attack the player. When inside a cabin Jason will attack the player in a way reminiscent of the video game Punch-Out!!. Players may light the fireplaces inside of larger cabins. Upon lighting all fireplaces, a flashlight and torch weapon are available. Notes are found in some larger cabins leading the player to other notes in other locations, eventually leading to new items. The objective of the game is to survive for three days and three nights while attempting to find and kill Jason. Players may battle Jason's mother who is in a hidden locked room in the cave. She is represented as a Medusa-like floating head that swoops down to attack the player.  Navigating in the woods or cave can be confusing as they are set up to purposely disorient the player. They hide several locked rooms/cabins. If all counselors or children die, the game is over.

Characters
The player can choose from six camp counselors at the start of the game. The currently played counselor can be changed after stepping into a small cabin, which allows for quick traversal across the map in times that a counselor or the children are being attacked. It is also possible to trade items with unplayed counselors by moving to their location. Each counselor has strengths and weaknesses in speed and they could make the difference in surviving or dying during the course of the game:
Chrissy is the strongest female character, with fast running speed, fast weapon throwing speed, and a high jump, but her rowing speed is slow.
Debbie is the weakest female character, with fast weapon throwing and average rowing speed, but slow running speed and low jump height.
George is the weakest male character, possessing slow running speed, low jump and average weapon throwing speed, but with a fast rowing speed
Laura has fast movement speed, fast weapon throwing speed, but with a low jump and average rowing speed.
Mark is the strongest male character, with fast running speed, a high jump and fast rowing speed, but with a slow weapon throwing speed.
Paul has a slow running speed and a low jump, but fast rowing speed and fast weapon throwing speed

Development
Friday the 13th was developed by Atlus and published by LJN for the Nintendo Entertainment System video game console. It was released in February 1989. Its music and sound effects were designed by Hirohiko Takayama. It is an adaptation of the film franchise of the same name. It was developed as part of an "aggressive expansion" by LJN to focus on video games based on media licenses.

Reception
Friday the 13th was released in North America exclusively in February 1989, as part of LJN's focus on creating video games based on licenses. It is considered by some to be one of the worst games of all time.
Game Informer lists the game among the most difficult horror games of all time. Michigan Dailys Matt Grandstaff called it a "poor offering" by LJN.<ref>{{cite web|last = Grandstaff| first= Matt|url=http://www.michigandaily.com/content/videogames-movies-make-formidable-mix-gamecubes-rogue-leader |title=Videogames, movies make formidable mix with Gamecubes Rogue Leader |publisher=The Michigan Daily |date=2001-11-27 |access-date=2010-10-18}}</ref> GamePro listed it as the 10th worst video game based on a film, criticizing its "repetitive music score and amazingly frustrating gameplay". In 1997, Electronic Gaming Monthly ranked it the eighth worst console video game of all time. GamesRadars Mikel Reparaz criticized its box, commenting that only LJN "would ever think to surround Jason Voorhees with neon-pastel vomit, thereby making him even more of an '80s relic than he already is." Writer Christopher Grant commented that the game was more terrible than the deaths of the campers in the first Friday the 13th film, calling it "craptacular". IGNs Levi Buchanan used this game as an example of LJN's poor development abilities. The book Vintage Games: An Insider Look at the History of Grand Theft Auto, Super Mario, and the Most Influential Games of All Time criticizes it for not being frightening, citing technical reasons for this. The authors of Nintendo Power rated Friday the 13th the sixth worst game ever made in the magazine's September 1997 issue. The writer stated "After playing a few minutes of this aardvark, you wanted Jason to slaughter all the counselors and then you. Anything so it would just end." Joystiqs James Ransom-Wiley noted it as a game that the staff "loved to hate." The Daily News of Los Angeles, however, noted it as a hit.

Legacy 
In June 2013, the National Entertainment Collectibles Association released an exclusive figurine of the video game-style Jason with the turquoise and purple color palette to go along with their other Nintendo-esque horror figure, a video game-style Freddy Krueger based on LJN's A Nightmare on Elm Street game.

In 2017, after developer IllFonic released Friday the 13th: The Game, a "Retro Jason" skin based on Jason from the 1989 game was added by developers in a video game patch to apologize to fans for issues the game experienced when initially released.

See alsoFriday the 13th: The Computer GameFriday the 13th: The Game''
A Nightmare on Elm Street (1989 video game)
List of video games notable for negative reception

References

1989 video games
1980s horror video games
Atlus games
LJN games
Nintendo Entertainment System games
Nintendo Entertainment System-only games
North America-exclusive video games
Survival video games
Video games based on Friday the 13th (franchise)
Video games developed in Japan
Video games scored by Hirohiko Takayama
Video games set in New Jersey
Video games set in forests
Single-player video games